This is a list of cities in the Baltic states by population. The population is measured within city limits on a national level, independently, by each statistical bureau. They are: Latvijas Statistika (Latvia), Statistics Estonia, and the Department of Statistics (Lithuania). Of the top 30 cities by population in the Baltics, 15 are Lithuanian, 10 are Latvian, and 5 are Estonian.

See also
List of cities in Lithuania
List of cities in Latvia
List of cities and towns in Estonia
List of metropolitan areas by population
List of urban areas in the Nordic countries
Largest metropolitan areas in the Nordic countries
List of metropolitan areas in Sweden

References and notes

ISPV Pasvaldibas iedzivotaju skaits pagasti.pdf 
The Statistical Yearbook of Lithuania 2010
  Nuolatinių gyventojų skaičius apskrityse ir savivaldybėse 201* liepos 1 d.

Cities by population
+
+
+
Estonia geography-related lists
Latvia geography-related lists
Lithuania geography-related lists